Korean National Airlines (KNA) was the first (commercial cargo and passenger) air carrier in Korea. Established in 1946 and incorporated in 1948 in South Korea, and its first official passenger flight was from Seoul to Pusan on October 30, 1948 (which is now Korea's National Air Day holiday). The carrier was an international carrierthough it was privately owned by its Founding Chairman, Captain Shin Yong-Wook. It operated under the brand name Koreanair.

KNA operated from 1947 to 1950 with Stinson Voyager aircraft, suspended operations from 1950 to 1952 due to the Korean War, and resumed flying in 1952 with Douglas DC-3 and Douglas DC-4 aircraft.

In late 1961, many Korean industries, including transportation, were nationalized in an effort to spur the country's economic growth. Shin Yong-Wook challenged the government's authority to nationalize his company, but KNA was ultimately taken over in a forced acquisition by the government in 1962.

Fleet
The Korean National Airlines fleet ultimately consisted of the following aircraft:

Two Fokker F.27 Friendships were on order by KNA at the time of its demise and were eventually operated by Korean Air Lines.

Destinations

KNA served the following destinations:

Busan - three daily DC-3 services in 1957; two daily DC-3 and DC-4 services by 1961
Gangneung - four DC-3 services per week as of 1957; weekly by 1961
Gwangju - two weekly DC-3 services in 1957; three by 1961
Hong Kong - weekly DC-4 service in 1957; weekly Constellation service by 1961
Seattle - charter Constellation service in 1959
Manila - Charter Service during 1954 Asian Games
Jeju - three weekly DC-3 services from Gwangju by 1961
Seoul (Hub)

References

노고지리의 증언 (한국항공대학교출판부 1999.3.29)
http://news.chosun.com/site/data/html_dir/2010/01/21/2010012101878.html?srchCol=news&srchUrl=news1
http://www.dailyjeonbuk.com/news/articleView.html?idxno=62220
http://blog.ohmynews.com/post9/tag/KNA

Defunct airlines of South Korea
Airlines established in 1948
Airlines disestablished in 1962
1962 disestablishments in South Korea
South Korean companies established in 1946